Martin Smolenski (Bulgarian: Мартин Смоленски; born 8 March 2003) is a Bulgarian footballer who plays as a midfielder for Pirin Blagoevgrad on loan from CSKA Sofia.

Career
Smolenski joined CSKA Sofia as an 7-year-old and progressed through the club's academy system. He made his senior debut on 9 March 2019, a day after his 16th birthday, in a 3–1 league win over Etar at Ivaylo Stadium, replacing Jorginho for the final 2 minutes. In July 2022 he was loaned out to Pirin Blagoevgrad.

Career statistics

Club
As of 19 March 2023

Honours
CSKA Sofia
 Bulgarian Cup: 2020–21

References

External links
 

2003 births
Living people
Bulgarian footballers
Association football midfielders
PFC CSKA Sofia players
PFC Litex Lovech players
PFC Minyor Pernik players
OFC Pirin Blagoevgrad players
First Professional Football League (Bulgaria) players
Footballers from Sofia